Nokia Asha 203 is a mobile phone from Nokia part of the Asha family. which was released in February 2012. The device features a touchscreen with keypad, and runs on Series 40 Software.

See also 
 List of Nokia products

References 

Asha 205